Interstate 430 (I-430) is a  Interstate highway in Pulaski County, Arkansas, that bypasses the cities of Little Rock and North Little Rock. I-430 begins at an interchange southwest of Downtown Little Rock with I-30, U.S. Highway 67 (US 67), and US 70 and travels north to cross the Arkansas River and end at I-40 and US 65. The first plans for the freeway appeared in 1955.

Route description

I-430 starts its  route at a trumpet interchange with I-30, US 67, and US 70. From the interchange, US 70 joins I-430 as it travels northwest and runs over Highway 338 (AR 338, Baseline Road) before having a diamond interchange with AR 5 (Stagecoach Road). At the interchange, US 70 splits off onto Stagecoach Road to the east, with AR 5 running west. I-430 goes north to pass Remington College and intersect AR 300 (Colonel Glenn Road) before curving eastward to intersect Shackleford Road and then turning back north. Immediately after going under Kanis Road, the highway has a cloverleaf interchange with I-630 at its western terminus. After I-630, the roadway goes past Immanuel Baptist Church and Breckenridge Village to intersect Rodney Parham Road near the Colony West Shopping Center and later AR 10 (Cantrell Road). The AR 10 interchange was the final I-430 interchange before the freeway crossed the Arkansas River on the I-430 Bridge. After the bridge, the roadway passes Rosenbaum Lake and intersects with AR 100 (Crystal Hill Road) before ending at a three-way interchange with I-40 and US 65.

History

Early plans for the Interstate Highway System include a route along roughly the same alignment as the present I-30 through the Little Rock area but are not detailed enough to show exactly how the cities would be served. Later, in 1955, a map of the Interstate Highway's plans shows a complete beltway around Little Rock, including present-day I-430, I-440, and AR 440. When preliminary urban routes were laid out in 1955, the beltway was shortened to the current route of I-430.

The American Association of State Highway and Transportation Officials (AASHTO) rerouted US 70 onto the southern portion of I-430 in May 2021 as part of a US 70 rerouting across Little Rock.

Exit list

References

External links

4
30-4
30-4
Transportation in Little Rock, Arkansas
Transportation in Pulaski County, Arkansas
North Little Rock, Arkansas